Ross Hull (born August 25, 1975) is a Canadian actor and television personality. He is known for his role as Chris Sheppard on Canadian sitcom Student Bodies and as Gary, the leader of the Midnight Society, on the television series Are You Afraid of the Dark?.

Early life and acting career
Born in Montreal, Quebec, Hull began his acting career in 1987 with the film Nowhere to Hide. Hull also appeared in other shows, including Ready or Not and Are You Afraid of the Dark?. and then landed the role of Chris Sheppard in Student Bodies. He made an appearance on Stargate Atlantis in the episode Suspicion.

Weather anchor career
In January 2005, Hull became a weather personality on Canada's The Weather Network, after completing the Meteorology Program from Mississippi State University and graduating with a Bachelor's degree in Radio and Television Arts from Ryerson University in Toronto.

In April 2007, Ross became a temporary reporter for the Vancouver area, replacing Oga Nwobosi while she was on maternity leave.

On December 15, 2008, Hull left The Weather Network and became a reporter for Citytv Calgary.

On September 8, 2010, Hull became the weather anchor for A London, in London, Ontario, where he forecasted the weather for London and the entire region of Southwestern Ontario.

In June 2011, Hull became a weather anchor for CTV Kitchener.

In early 2013, he appeared as the weather anchor for CBC Ottawa and CBC News Network. He subsequently became weather anchor for CBC Toronto until the end of June, 2014. He is now a meteorologist with Global Toronto.

Currently, Ross Hull is a multi-market meteorologist for Global News. He works in Toronto but produces forecasts for Toronto, Montreal, Halifax, and New Brunswick on weekdays with the addition of Winnipeg, Regina, and Saskatoon on the weekends.

Personal life

Ross is openly gay. He explains, "As for being 'out,' I think that's all a part of being comfortable with who you are and that ultimately helps you in all aspects of life. It's not always easy to get to that point though, which is why a supportive community always helps as well as knowing that others have taken that path (with success) before you."

Filmography

References

External links
 
 Ross Hull at Global News
 Ross Hull at CTV News

1975 births
Male actors from Montreal
Anglophone Quebec people
Canadian male film actors
Canadian male child actors
Canadian male television actors
Canadian male voice actors
Canadian television meteorologists
Canadian LGBT broadcasters
Canadian gay actors
Living people
Toronto Metropolitan University alumni
Mississippi State University alumni
CBC Television people
Global Television Network people
20th-century Canadian male actors
21st-century Canadian male actors
21st-century Canadian LGBT people
20th-century Canadian LGBT people